"Záhradná kaviareň" is a song by Marika Gombitová released on OPUS in 1983.

The composition, written by Lehotský along with Kamil Peteraj, was promoted as the third single taken from the album of the same name Záhradná kaviareň by Modus (1983).

Official versions
 "Záhradná kaviareň" - Studio version, 1983

Credits and personnel
 Marika Gombitová - lead vocal
 Janko Lehotský - music, lead vocal
 Kamil Peteraj - lyrics
 OPUS - copyright

References

General

Specific

1983 songs
1983 singles
Marika Gombitová songs
Modus (band) songs
Songs written by Ján Lehotský
Songs written by Kamil Peteraj
Slovak-language songs